For the CKOI radio network, see CKOI (network).

CKOI-FM is a French-language Canadian radio station located in Verdun, Quebec and serving the Greater Montreal area, airing a CHR/Top 40 radio format.

Owned and operated by Cogeco, CKOI-FM broadcasts on 96.9 MHz with its transmitter on Mount Royal with an effective radiated power (ERP) of 148,000 watts (Class C1) using an omnidirectional antenna.  It was one of the few full market Montreal-area FM stations not to use the Mount Royal broadcasting tower, until it moved there in late 2018. It is one of North America's highest-powered FM stations. Its studios are located at Place Bonaventure.

History
CKVL-FM, the station's original call letters, was founded by Jack Tietolman and Corey Thomson and probably went on the air at some point between 1947 and 1957. Sources disagree on the date, and at least seven different years (including three post-1957 ones) have been reported as the station's first air date.  The confusion is increased by the fact that there is no known report suggesting that the station went silent for any noticeable period of time after getting on the air, despite this phenomenon being relatively common among 1950s FM stations.  In any case, the Canadian Communication Foundation reports the station first signed on in 1947 and that CKVL-FM was confirmed as being on the air in 1957.

The station was originally a full-time FM simulcast of its AM-based sister station, CKVL.  As such, the station was bilingual (French/English), with the majority of programming being in French.

By 1962, CKVL-FM increased its power from 10,000 watts to 307,000 watts omnidirectional from the rooftop of the CIBC Tower in downtown Montreal. It is often believed that this unusual high power was granted as the result of a clerical error by the Canadian Radio-television and Telecommunications Commission (CRTC), but that government organization did not exist at the time as radio was still regulated by the CRTC's predecessor, the Board of Broadcast Governors.  Regulations limiting effective radiated power to 100,000 watts on FM, which came into force that same year, did not apply to stations which had already received approval for a higher power.

The simulcast of CKVL ended in 1970, with CKVL-FM launching an automated oldies format, calling itself "VL-FM."  The station played French-language Top 40 hits of the 1950s and 1960s, including remakes of English-language hits translated into French as well as a few original English-language songs.  There were no DJs.

On December 6, 1976, CKVL-FM became CKOI-FM, and the station's format was changed to progressive rock, with a full-time DJ staff. It evolved into a largely new wave-based format in 1979 and moved to a rock-leaning Top 40/CHR format in 1980.

The fall 1991 Bureau of Broadcast Measurement ratings were a defining moment for the station, as it found itself in first place in Montreal with over a million listeners in full coverage. It was the first time that an FM station finished in first place in the fall ratings, which are the most important for the radio industry as they are used to determine prices charged for advertising. CKOI-FM would have over a million listeners in 32 consecutive books (excluding summer ratings starting in 2001, which were only compiled for the central area of the market), from fall 1991 to fall 2002 inclusively.  (The station had already managed to get a million listeners on a few occasions during summer ratings before 1991.)  The station's best-ever results under the old diary system were obtained in the spring 1995 ratings, in which CKOI-FM registered 1,341,300 listeners.  By comparison, CKAC, which had been Montreal's usual #1 station, had 775,500 listeners.

CKOI-FM, along with sister station CKVL, was sold in 1992 by its founder Jack Tietolman to Metromedia CMR, a company owned by Pierre Arcand and Pierre Béland.  Both stations would be sold again in 2001, this time to Corus Entertainment.

On January 1, 2002, the station's city of licence became Montreal.  Until then, it had officially been Verdun; however, as a result of a forced municipal merger, the city of Verdun became a borough of Montreal.

CKOI-FM long had the highest power output of any radio station in Canada, and the second highest power in North America, only exceeded by WBCT in Grand Rapids, Michigan, which operates at 320,000 watts.  Unlike other North American superpower FM stations that have lowered their power since the 1990s, CKOI-FM actively protected its 307,000-watt signal.  For instance, when Industry Canada advised the station in 2004 that it was out of compliance with updated Code 6 safety regulations (which deal with acceptable levels of radiation), owner Corus Entertainment invested in emission reduction equipment instead of simply reducing power, which would have restricted output to 122,800 watts.

The station's studios were moved for the first time in July 2006, after decades at 211 Gordon Avenue in Verdun.  The new studios are located at Place Bonaventure in downtown Montreal.

On April 30, 2010, Cogeco announced it would purchase Corus Quebec's radio stations, including CKOI-FM, for $80 million. On December 17, 2010, the CRTC approved the sale of most of Corus's radio stations in Quebec, including CKOI-FM, to Cogeco.

On November 24, 2011, the CRTC determined that CKOI-FM had abusively used musical montages of English-language songs in order to circumvent French-language music quotas, and imposed a condition of licence on the station limiting the broadcasting of montages to 10 percent of the broadcast week.

In 2016, Cogeco applied to the CRTC for permission to move the transmission site to Mount Royal, as space had become available there after the digital TV transition. Moreover, the move would allow Cogeco to co-locate all its Montreal FM stations, and the superior location would require lower power to achieve the same reception range. The transmitter was moved in late 2018. Effective radiated power is now limited to 148,000 watts, still much higher than the usual maximum.

Shortwave relay
For a period in the 1990s, CKOI-FM was simulcast over shortwave relay station CFCX on 6095 kHz, which had previously relayed CKOI's then-sister station CINW. In 1999, the transmitter was taken out of service due to its age and was not repaired or replaced, bringing shortwave service to an end.

Personalities
Throughout the 2000s, the station has been known especially for pranks by the Masked Avengers, a duo composed of Marc-Antoine Audette and Sebastien Trudel, against internationally-known personalities such as Jacques Chirac, Britney Spears, Sarah Palin  and George W. Bush. The duo appeared first on a weekend morning show Les Justiciers Masqués, and later on a daily afternoon show Les Cerveaux de l'info, along with co-host Richard Z. Sirois.

Comedian Pierre Brassard, also known for prank phone calls, was also previously associated with the station.

CKOI-FM lost its longtime morning host Normand Brathwaite on March 17, 2006, following a conflict with former co-host Jean-René Dufort.  Dufort became the station's morning host until June 22, 2007.  Braithwaite joined CITE-FM in August 2011.

One of the peak of daily audience is the record-setting program  ("the six at six"), the top six hits at that point in time, broadcast daily at 6PM.

Slogans
 1980s-1990s: Le son de Montréal (The sound of Montreal)
 2000s: Plus de hits, plus de fun (More hits, more fun)
 2009-2011: La puissance musicale de Montréal (The musical power of Montreal)
 February–August 2011:  L'ultime radio (Ultimate radio)
 August 2011-August 2012: La puissance des hits (Hit power)
 August 2012 – 2015: Mes hits. Mon fun. (My hits.  My fun.)
 2015–present: Changeons le monde un hit à la fois. (Changing the world one hit at a time.)

Notes

External links
CKOI 96.9
 

Koi
Koi
Koi
Radio stations established in 1976
Koi
1976 establishments in Quebec